Pedro Curiel (born 1902, date of death unknown) was a Mexican long-distance runner. He competed in the men's 5000 metres at the 1924 Summer Olympics.

References

External links
 

1902 births
Year of death missing
Athletes (track and field) at the 1924 Summer Olympics
Mexican male long-distance runners
Olympic athletes of Mexico
Place of birth missing
20th-century Mexican people